Centrinites is a genus of flower weevils in the beetle family Curculionidae. There are about 19 described species in Centrinites.

Species
These 19 species belong to the genus Centrinites:

 Centrinites audax Champion & G.C., 1908
 Centrinites boliviensis Hustache, 1950
 Centrinites colonus Kuschel, 1983
 Centrinites conicicollis Casey, 1922
 Centrinites dentimanus Champion & G.C., 1908
 Centrinites dissipatus Champion & G.C., 1908
 Centrinites egenus Casey, 1920
 Centrinites fuscipennis Casey, 1922
 Centrinites laticrus Champion & G.C., 1908
 Centrinites lineatulus Hustache, 1950
 Centrinites nanus Casey, 1922
 Centrinites ovoideus Casey, 1922
 Centrinites separatus Casey, 1922
 Centrinites setipennis Champion & G.C., 1908
 Centrinites solutus Kuschel, 1983
 Centrinites strigicollis Casey, 1892
 Centrinites submetallicus Hustache & A., 1938
 Centrinites t-flavum Champion & G.C., 1908
 Centrinites uniseriatus Champion & G.C., 1908

References

Further reading

 
 
 

Baridinae
Articles created by Qbugbot